Muhammad Khalid Bizenjo is a Pakistani politician and the member-elect of the Senate of Pakistan.

Political career
He was elected to the Senate of Pakistan from Balochistan province representing Balochistan Awami Party. The election was held on 12 September 2020 between him and Maulana Ghousullah. He garnered 38 votes while Ghousullah received 21 votes.

References

Living people
Balochistan Awami Party politicians
Politicians from Balochistan, Pakistan
Date of birth missing (living people)
Year of birth missing (living people)
Members of the Senate of Pakistan